Francisco Manuel Tena Jaramillo (born 28 June 1993) is a Spanish footballer who currently plays for SD Ejea as a midfielder.

Club career
Born in La Rinconada, Seville, Andalusia, Tena graduated from Real Betis' youth system, but made his senior debuts for CD Ronda in the 2012–13 season, in Tercera División. In June 2013 he returned to Betis, but subsequently moved to Segunda División B's Córdoba CF B in the following month.

In August, however, Tena rescinded with the Verdiblancos and joined CD Alcalá in the fourth level. After being an ever-present figure during the campaign, he signed a one-year deal with Sevilla FC on 4 July 2014, being assigned to the reserves in the third division.

Tena played his first match as a professional on 3 December 2014, coming on as a substitute for Antonio Cotán in the 82nd minute of a 5–1 home routing of CE Sabadell FC for the Copa del Rey.

In September 2018, Tena joined the Prva HNL team NK Istra 1961, but left the club in December of the same year, not featuring in a single game.

On 29 January 2019, Tena then signed with UD Sanse.

References

External links
Sevilla official profile 

1993 births
Living people
People from La Rinconada
Sportspeople from the Province of Seville
Spanish footballers
Footballers from Andalusia
Association football midfielders
Segunda División B players
Tercera División players
CD Ronda players
CD Alcalá players
Sevilla Atlético players
Sevilla FC players
Real Madrid Castilla footballers
UD San Sebastián de los Reyes players
SD Ejea players
NK Istra 1961 players